German submarine U-197 was a Type IXD2 U-boat of Nazi Germany's Kriegsmarine during World War II. The submarine was laid down on 5 July 1941 at the DeSchiMAG AG Weser yard in Bremen as yard number 1043. She was launched on 21 May 1942, and commissioned on 10 October under the command of Korvettenkapitän Robert Bartels. After training with the 4th U-boat Flotilla at Stettin, U-197 was transferred to the 12th U-boat Flotilla for front-line service on 1 April 1943.

Design
German Type IXD2 submarines were considerably larger than the original Type IXs. U-197 had a displacement of  when at the surface and  while submerged. She had two shafts and two  propellers.

U-197 was fitted with six  torpedo tubes (four fitted at the bow and two at the stern), 24 torpedoes, one  SK C/32 naval gun, 150 rounds, and a  SK C/30 with 2575 rounds as well as two  C/30 anti-aircraft guns with 8100 rounds. The boat had a complement of fifty-five.

Service history
U-197 sailed from Kiel on 3 April 1943 on her first and only combat patrol, sailing around the Cape of Good Hope to the waters south of Madagascar.

On 20 May, while in the South Atlantic, north-east of Ascension Island, she torpedoed the 4,763 GRT Dutch tanker Benakat. After the crew of 44 men abandoned ship in three lifeboats a second torpedo broke the ship in two, and the bow section sank. The U-boat surfaced and sank the stern section with her deck gun.

She torpedoed the unescorted 9,583 GRT Swedish tanker Pegasus south-west of Madagascar on 24 July. The ship, loaded with 12,855 tons of gasoline, sank in flames. All 38 of her crew survived.

A second torpedo narrowly missed, and despite a  hole in the port side, the ship escaped and arrived at Durban on 1 August under her own power.

The unescorted 6,921 GRT British merchant ship Empire Stanley was torpedoed and sunk south southeast of Cap Sainte Marie, Madagascar on 17 August. From the 54 men aboard, 25 lost their lives, while the 29 survivors were later picked up in two lifeboats.

Sinking
On 20 August 1943 U-197 was attacked south of Madagascar, in position , by a British PBY Catalina aircraft of No. 259 Squadron RAF with six depth charges and slightly damaged. As the aircraft had no more bombs, it attempted to strafe with her machine guns, but the U-boat responded with AA fire. The aircraft then circled the U-boat at a safe distance and radioed for assistance. The U-boat remained on the surface, perhaps assuming that any support was unlikely, and that the aircraft would depart. Another Catalina, FP 313 of 265 Squadron and piloted by captain Ernest Robin, (receiving the D.F.C. [Distinguished Flying Cross] for the sinking of the vessel), arrived. U-197 crash-dived, and the aircraft dropped three depth charges, two of which detonated to port of the U-boat, but the third hit the U-boat, killing all 67 hands.

Korvettenkapitän Robert Bartels of U-197 had radioed a distress signal. The correct response by any boat in the vicinity, according to orders, would have been to assist at top speed. The BdU twice ordered U-196 to aid U-197 before Kentrat responded, and by that time U-197 and the entire crew were lost.

Summary of raiding history

References

Bibliography

External links
 

World War II submarines of Germany
World War II shipwrecks in the Indian Ocean
German Type IX submarines
U-boats commissioned in 1942
Indian Ocean U-Boats
U-boats sunk in 1943
U-boats sunk by depth charges
U-boats sunk by British aircraft
1942 ships
Ships built in Bremen (state)
Ships lost with all hands
Maritime incidents in August 1943